Cristián Precht Bañados (born 23 September 1940) is a Chilean Catholic former priest, known for his work during the military dictatorship in defense of human rights. He was vicar of the Vicariate of Solidarity between 1976 and 1979. In September 2018, he was laicized for his participation in cases of child sexual abuse.

Career 

Precht gained national recognition in the 1980s when he served as head of the Church's Vicariate of Solidarity human rights group that challenged ex-dictator Augusto Pinochet to end the practice of torture in Chile.

In 1976, Precht was instrumental in the creation of APSI, a Chilean periodical opposed to the Pinochet regime which published until 1995.

He was accused of molesting boys, including those who came to him for confession, while visiting facilities of the Catholic religious institute the Marist Brothers, whom Chilean police have investigated regarding claims of sex abuse at many of the group's facilities.

Precht was suspended from ministry between 2012 and 2017 after being convicted by the Congregation for the Doctrine of the Faith. On 12 September 2018, Precht was convicted of sexually abusing minors and adults, and Pope Francis laicized him.

See also 

 APSI
 Catholic Church in Chile
 Catholic Church sex abuse cases by country
 Catholic sexual abuse cases in Chile
 Human rights in Chile
 Los archivos del cardenal 
 Marist Brothers
 Roman Catholic Archdiocese of Santiago de Chile

References

External links 
Vicaría General de Pastoral del Arzobispado de Santiago [The General Vicariate of Ministry of the Archdiocese of Santiago] at the Internet archive (in Spanish)

Living people
Laicized Roman Catholic priests
20th-century Chilean Roman Catholic priests
Catholic priests convicted of child sexual abuse
1940 births
21st-century Chilean Roman Catholic priests